The following is a list of current and former spa towns in the United Kingdom.

England

Derbyshire

Buxton, Derbyshire
Matlock, Derbyshire
Matlock Bath, Derbyshire

Worcestershire
Droitwich Spa, Worcestershire
Malvern, Worcestershire
Tenbury Wells, Worcestershire

Yorkshire
Askern, Doncaster
Boston Spa, West Yorkshire
Harrogate, North Yorkshire
Ilkley, West Yorkshire
Knaresborough, North Yorkshire

Other
Bath, Somerset
Cheltenham, Gloucestershire
Church Stretton, Shropshire
Dorton Spa, Buckinghamshire
Epsom, Surrey
Royal Leamington Spa, Warwickshire
Royal Tunbridge Wells, Kent
Shearsby, Leicestershire
Woodhall Spa, Lincolnshire

Wales

Builth Wells
Llandrindod Wells
Llangammarch Wells
Llanwrtyd Wells

Former spa towns

England
Ashby-de-la-Zouch, Leicestershire
Bakewell, Derbyshire
Baslow, Derbyshire
Bricket Wood, Hertfordshire
Clifton/Hotwells, Bristol
Ewell, Surrey
Goathland, North Yorkshire
Hartlepool, County Durham
Hockley, Essex
Hovingham, North Yorkshire
Leeds, West Yorkshire
Melksham, Wiltshire
Ossett, West Yorkshire
Ripon, North Yorkshire
Scarborough, North Yorkshire
Stoney Middleton, Derbyshire 
Wigan, Greater Manchester
Wirksworth, Derbyshire

Scotland
Bridge of Allan, Stirling (formerly in Stirlingshire)
Crieff, Perth and Kinross (formerly in Perthshire)
Dunblane, Stirling (formerly in Perthshire)
Moffat, Dumfries and Galloway (formerly in Dumfriesshire)
Peebles, Scottish Borders (formerly in Peebleshire)
Rothesay, Rothesay, Argyll and Bute (formerly in the County of Bute)
Strathpeffer, Ross and Cromarty (formerly in Ross-shire)

Wales
Taff's Well Thermal Spring, near Cardiff
Chalybeate springs, near Trefriw; the village was promoted in the first half of the 20th century as Trefriw Spa

See also
 List of spa towns

Notes

References

 
Spa
United Kingdom